The European Coatings Journal is an English-language trade magazine for the coatings industry. It is published by Vincentz Network. It was established in 1986. According to the Informationsgemeinschaft zur Feststellung der Verbreitung von Werbeträgern, it reached about 33.000 readers per issue in 2010. The European Coatings Journal is an official partner of the Conseil Européen de l'Industrie des Peintures, des Encres d'Imprimerie et des Couleurs d'Arts, the European coatings association.

Content

Professional articles 
Topics from research and development as well as topics from coatings production and raw materials are dealt with in extensive articles. There is always one main topic (e.g. powder coating, additives or water based coatings). The articles are written by external professionals and revised by the editorial team.

Categories 
Next to professional articles which compose the main part of the journal, there are some permanent sections:

 Market Watch (An overview of relevant M&A, investments, and cooperations in the European paint, coatings and printing inks industry. Exclusive interviews with leading players in the coatings industry, plus indispensable special reports on important coatings and raw material market segments.)
 Association (Structure, strategy and main issues of different associations, which are active in the European paint, coatings and printing inks industry.)
 Technical Papers (High-level technical articles on latest developments in coatings technology written by internationally renowned coatings experts from industry and academia.) 
 Events (Exclusive reports from international conferences, meetings and coatings shows.)
 Market Place (Offers an overview of new products, including raw materials, testing, laboratory and production equipment.)

Special topics 
The European Coatings Journal publishes preliminary reports and news reports about subject specific fairs and congresses (e.g. FATIPEC-Congress, European Coatings Show).

Market studies of various key markets are published at irregular intervals.

Special issues 
The EC Directory is a buyer's guide for the coatings industry. It includes company profiles and an overview of the most important organizations and institutes.

See also
List of magazines in Germany

References

External links 
 

1986 establishments in West Germany
Business magazines published in Germany
Coatings
English-language magazines
Magazines established in 1986
Monthly magazines published in Germany
Paint and coatings industry
Professional and trade magazines
Mass media in Hanover